Burguillos (37°35'3.84" N -5°57'59.54" W) is a locality in the province of Sevilla, in the region of Andalusia, Spain. In 2005, it had 4,142 inhabitants, and extended over an area of 42 km², giving the town a population density of 98.6 people per km².  Burguillos lies at an elevation of 80 meters, and is located 23 kilometers from the provincial capital, Sevilla.

References

Municipalities of the Province of Seville